Lenore Zann (born November 22, 1959) is a Canadian actress and former politician who has served as the Member of Parliament (MP) for the riding of Cumberland—Colchester in the House of Commons of Canada as a member of the Liberal Party. Before entering federal politics, she represented the electoral district of Truro-Bible Hill in the Nova Scotia House of Assembly from 2009 until 2019 as a member of the Nova Scotia New Democratic Party and from June 9, 2019, until September 12, 2019, as an independent.

Life and career
Zann was born on November 22, 1959, in Sydney, New South Wales, Australia, the daughter of Janice, a high school teacher, and Paul Zann, a professor. Her great-grandfather, named Zaninovich (Zaninović), came to Australia from Croatia.

She emigrated with her parents to Canada in 1968, first to Regina, Saskatchewan, then to Truro, Nova Scotia, and later graduated from Cobequid Educational Centre, a high school in Truro, which was noted for its student musical productions. She attended York University in Toronto where she studied drama, fine arts and political science.

Zann worked as a screen, television, stage, and voice actress, and appeared in numerous television shows, films, radio, and animated series. As an actor, she is best known for providing the voice of Rogue on the 1992 animated television adaptation of the X-Men comic book series. Zann will be reprising the role in X-Men '97, the series' upcoming Disney+ revival.

After living in Halifax, Toronto, London, Stockholm, Vancouver, Los Angeles, and New York City, Zann returned to Truro in 2008.

That fall she started a community campaign to restore a historic former academic building in downtown Truro, Provincial Normal College, into a cultural centre. She raised $62,000 for a feasibility study following which the four-story, 24,000-square-foot provincially designated Victorian brick building was repurposed to become the centre point of downtown Truro – the town's new Central Colchester Regional Library, with a skating rink in front during winter months.

During her first four years as a backbencher in the first NDP government in Nova Scotia Zann was appointed ministerial assistant for three positions: culture & heritage, environment & climate change, and deputy premier – unsuccessfully working to reinstate the Nova Scotia Arts Council and improve the film tax credit for the film and TV industry.

As a first-time opposition member Zann has been NDP spokesperson for education, environment, status of women, Human Rights Commission, Aboriginal affairs & truth & reconciliation, agriculture, advanced education, African NS affairs, and Gaelic affairs.

During her ten years as MLA, she introduced two successful bills. Bill 90 amended the Nova Scotia Provincial Exhibition Commission Act to increase the size of the board of directors to ten. Bill 74 changed the name of the new electoral district of Truro–Bible Hill to Truro–Bible Hill–Millbrook–Salmon River.

Political career
On April 8, 2009, Zann successfully ran for the Nova Scotia New Democratic Party nomination in the riding of Truro-Bible Hill.  On the same day, an employee of the Liberal Party leaked a topless photo of her to the media from her appearance in The L Word.  Zann was elected in the 2009 provincial election and served as the ministerial assistant for the Department of Tourism, Culture, and Heritage.  She was subsequently re-elected in the 2013 provincial election to represent the reconfigured electoral district, now called Truro-Bible Hill-Millbrook-Salmon River.

In that election the NDP was reduced to seven seats in the legislature and third-party status. Zann served as the NDP critic for Aboriginal affairs, community culture and heritage, community services, education, Human Rights Commission / status of women, and seniors and disabled.

Zann introduced bill 111, the Environmental Racism Prevention Act, addressing the issue of environmental racism in Nova Scotia. The bill was not considered by the house.

On June 12, 2015, Zann announced her bid for the leadership of the Nova Scotia New Democratic Party. On February 27, 2016, Zann was defeated in her leadership bid, losing to Gary Burrill on the second ballot.

On June 9, 2019, Zann announced she would seek the Liberal nomination to succeed retiring Liberal MP Bill Casey in Cumberland—Colchester for the 2019 federal election. She chose to leave the NDP for the Liberals because she believed the Liberals stood a better chance of winning. She sat as an independent member in Nova Scotia's legislature as she sought the nomination. Zann won the federal Liberal nomination on July 27, 2019, defeating three other candidates including Casey's constituency assistant. She resigned her seat on September 12.

During the 43rd Canadian Parliament, she introduced one private member bill, Bill C-230, An Act respecting the development of a national strategy to redress environmental racism which sought to require the Minister of the Environment to develop a national strategy which would examine the link between race, socio-economic status and environmental risk. It was brought to a vote on March 24, 2021, and advanced to committee stage with Liberal, NDP and Green Party members voting in favour. However, the parliament ended before the bill could be considered for third reading.

In the 2021 federal election Zann lost her seat to Conservative candidate Stephen Ellis.

Electoral record

Federal

Provincial

|-

|New Democratic Party
|Lenore Zann
|align="right"|3,165 
|align="right"|38.10 
|align="right"|
|-

|Liberal
|Barry J. Mellish 
|align="right"|2,682 
|align="right"|32.20 
|align="right"|

|Progressive Conservative
|Charles Cox
|align="right"|2,470 
|align="right"|29.70 
|align="right"|
|-
|}

|-

|New Democratic Party
|Lenore Zann
|align="right"|4,147
|align="right"|48.40
|align="right"|
|-

|Progressive Conservative
|Hughie MacIsaac
|align="right"|2,607
|align="right"|30.42
|align="right"|
|-

|Liberal
|Bob Hagell
|align="right"|1,651
|align="right"|19.27
|align="right"|
|-

|}

Filmography

Film (live action)

Film (animated)

Television (live action)

Television (animated)

Video games

References

External links
 
 Lenore Zann's NSNDP profile 
 

1959 births
Actresses from Nova Scotia
Australian people of Croatian descent
Australian emigrants to Canada
Australian expatriate actresses in the United States
Australian television actresses
Australian video game actresses
Australian voice actresses
Canadian people of Croatian descent
Canadian actor-politicians
Canadian television actresses
Canadian video game actresses
Canadian voice actresses
Living people
Nova Scotia New Democratic Party MLAs
Nova Scotia Independent MLAs
Actresses from Sydney
People from Truro, Nova Scotia
Women MLAs in Nova Scotia
York University alumni
20th-century Canadian actresses
21st-century Canadian actresses
21st-century Canadian politicians
21st-century Canadian women politicians
Liberal Party of Canada MPs
Women members of the House of Commons of Canada
Members of the House of Commons of Canada from Nova Scotia